American country music band Old Dominion has released four studio albums, two extended plays, and thirteen singles. Founded in 2012, the band began recording after three of its members, Matthew Ramsey, Trevor Rosen, and Brad Tursi, all had success as songwriters for other artists. This led to them self-releasing an extended play titled It Was Always Yours in 2012, followed by a self-titled one in 2014. Produced by Shane McAnally, the latter included their debut single "Shut Me Up".

This song's success led to the band signing with RCA Records Nashville, for which they have released four studio albums: Meat and Candy in 2015, Happy Endings in 2017, Old Dominion in 2019, and Time, Tequila, & Therapy in 2021. These albums have accounted for multiple chart entries on the Billboard Hot Country Songs and Country Airplay charts. On the latter, they have reached the number-one position with "Break Up with Him", "Song for Another Time", "No Such Thing as a Broken Heart", "Written in the Sand", "Hotel Key", "Make It Sweet", and "One Man Band".

Studio albums

Extended plays

Singles

Featured singles

Other charted songs

Music videos

Notes

References

Country music discographies
Discographies of American artists